Alternative Baseball, officially Alternative Baseball Organization Inc. (ABO), is a 501(c)(3) nonprofit organization based in Dallas, Georgia, United States, which provides year-round baseball training, exhibitions, and activities for teens and adults (ages 15+) with autism and other disabilities throughout the United States.

Alternative Baseball was founded in 2016 by Taylor Duncan, an autism activist from Dallas, Georgia, who was denied opportunities to play traditional baseball as a youth and faced social stigma from coaches.

Alternative Baseball uses the same rule-set as seen in Major League Baseball. The only adaption made in Alternative Baseball is the type of ball used: A baseball sized slightly larger and much softer than a regulation-sized baseball in order to safely accommodate players of all skill and experience levels from novice to professional.

Alternative Baseball encourages locals to volunteer and assist with establishing new programs to serve those in their individual areas. The organization started expanding across the United States in 2018 after finding a serious lack of programming geared for adults with disabilities to continue their enrichment toward successful independence post-high school graduation. Alternative Baseball currently has programs (and new ones starting up) in Alabama, Arizona, Colorado, Florida, Georgia, Illinois, New Jersey, North Carolina, South Carolina, Tennessee, Texas, and Washington with many more clubs and programs to be started across the country. Registration in Canada is also currently pending.
Alternative Baseball Organization along with its founder and Commissioner Taylor C. Duncan along with other people who have volunteered for ABO have owned stock in the Atlanta Braves, he has helped others to become into the Autism awareness community and speaking engagements. One time the ABO, Taylor Duncan was the main sponsors of Rome Braves Hotstove event in Downtown Rome, Georgia at the River Forum Center.

See also 
 Autism rights movement
 Amateur baseball in the United States
 Disabled sports
 International Paralympic Committee

References 

Parasports organizations
Sports organizations established in 2016
Non-profit organizations based in Georgia (U.S. state)
Baseball leagues in the United States
Baseball governing bodies in the United States
Autism-related organizations in the United States
Autism rights movement
Disability in the United States
Organizations based in Atlanta
Disability organizations based in the United States
2016 establishments in Georgia (U.S. state)
501(c)(3) organizations